Vietcong 2 is a tactical shooter video game, developed by Pterodon and Illusion Softworks, published by 2K Games for Microsoft Windows in October 2005, and set during the Vietnam War. It is the direct sequel to Vietcong.

Gameplay
The story takes place during the Tet Offensive in Hue. The player assumes the role of the disillusioned American MACV soldier Captain Daniel Boone (named after the MACSOG Operation Daniel Boone). Boone is part of a coalition of international forces from Australia, New Zealand and Canada. The game also gives the player the ability to fight the war from another perspective as a young Vietcong recruit fighting before and during the Tet Offensive. This campaign is unlocked when the player has completed a certain part of the American campaign.

Reception

Vietcong 2 received "mixed" reviews according to the review aggregation website Metacritic.

References

External links
 Pterodon official site
 Vietcong 2 publishers site
 

2005 video games
2K Czech games
2K games
Cold War video games
First-person shooters
Multiplayer and single-player video games
Multiplayer online games
Pterodon (company) games
Tactical shooter video games
Video game sequels
Video games developed in the Czech Republic
Video games set in 1968
Video games set in Vietnam
Vietnam War video games
Windows games
Windows-only games